Octagon House may refer to:

 Octagon house, a historical American house type built on an octagonal plan.
 Octagon House (novel), a 1937 mystery by Phoebe Atwood Taylor
 The Octagon House, Washington, D.C.
 See List of octagon houses for individual examples.

See also
 The Octagon (disambiguation)
 Octagon Barn (disambiguation)
 Octagon Building (disambiguation)
 Octagonal Schoolhouse (disambiguation)